Dr. Cándido Pérez is a Mexican comedy television series that premiered first in the United States on Univision on 13 June 2021. It is a reboot of the series of the same name. It stars Arath de la Torre in the title role, alongside Irán Castillo, Raquel Garza, Lorena de la Garza, Marcia Coutiño, David Ramos, and Ana Paula del Moral.

Premise 
Dr. Cándido Pérez is a charismatic gynecologist who must not fall into the temptation of his attractive patients and return home to the arms of his loving wife.

Cast 
 Arath de la Torre as Dr. Cándido Pérez
 Irán Castillo as Silvina
 Raquel Garza as Doña Cata
 Lorena de la Garza as Claudia
 Marcia Coutiño as Paula
 David Ramos as Father Camilo
 Ana Paula del Moral as Perlita

Production 
The sitcom was announced on 15 October 2020 at Visión21 upfront. The main cast was revealed on 1 March 2021, with production beginning the same day. A total of 13 episodes have been confirmed. In Mexico, the series was pulled from the Domingos de sofá Sunday block after 7 episodes. On 19 August 2021, it was announced that the series would move to the Noche de buenas weekday block in October 2021.

Episodes

References

External links 
 

2021 Mexican television series debuts
2021 Mexican television series endings
Las Estrellas original programming
Mexican television sitcoms
Television series by Televisa
Spanish-language television shows